Hating Breitbart is a 2012 political documentary about conservative media critic and alternative media icon Andrew Breitbart. The documentary was released on October 19, 2012, just seven months after Breitbart's sudden death.

The film was released by Rocky Mountain Pictures.

Release
The film had a limited theatrical run on October 19, 2012, and received an early video-on-demand release on May 17, 2013.

References

External links

2012 films
2012 documentary films
2012 independent films
American independent films
American documentary films
Documentary films about American politics
Documentary films about mass media people
2010s English-language films
2010s American films